Christian Wloch (born 1971 in Buenos Aires) is an Argentinian artist. Wloch trained in visual arts, film, video, multimedia and new technologies. Through visual and audio compositions explores geometric interdimensional universes generated from the light, sound and perception.

Bibliography 
 Ana Claudia Garcia, "Linkages in / with space", "Christian Wloch, Link," "Art and New Technologies" Sixth Edition "Buenos Aires Museum of Modern Art-FT, 4/5/2010
 Magdalena Jitrik, "Christian Wloch, The desire to reach the light," "wiggle Projection" Fundación Proa, 02/20/2005

References

External links 
 Official website 

1971 births
Artists from Buenos Aires
Living people
Argentine artists